The C&C 39 is a Canadian sailboat, that was designed by Cuthbertson & Cassian and first built in 1971.

Production
The boat was built by C&C Yachts in Canada, between 1971 and 1974. During its three-year production run, a total of 48 examples were completed.

Design
The C&C 39 is a small recreational keelboat, built predominantly of fiberglass, with wood trim. It has a  masthead sloop rig, an internally-mounted spade-type rudder and a swept fixed fin keel.

The boat is fitted with a Universal Atomic 4 gasoline engine.

A taller mast version was also produced that had a mast about  higher than the standard mast.

The tall mast version has a PHRF racing average handicap of 105 with a high of 115 and low of 99.

See also
List of sailing boat types

Similar sailboats
CS 40
Mirage 39
Santana 39

References

External links
 Original Factory Brochure - C&C 39, 6 page, B&W

Keelboats
1970s sailboat type designs
Sailing yachts
Sailboat type designs by C&C Design
Sailboat types built by C&C Yachts